Ynys Môn is a constituency of the Senedd. It elects one Member of the Senedd by the first past the post method of election. Also, however, it is one of nine constituencies in the North Wales electoral region, which elects four additional members, in addition to nine constituency members, to produce a degree of proportional representation for the region as a whole.

It was represented from 1999 by Ieuan Wyn Jones, the former leader of Plaid Cymru. Jones resigned from the Assembly on 20 June 2013, triggering a by-election, which was held on 1 August 2013. Plaid Cymru's candidate Rhun ap Iorwerth comfortably held the seat for the party with a majority of over 9000 votes.

Boundaries 

The constituency was created for the first election to the Assembly, in 1999, with the name and boundaries of the Ynys Môn Westminster constituency. It is entirely within the preserved county of Gwynedd.

As created in 1999, the North Wales region includes the constituencies of Alyn and Deeside, Caernarfon, Clwyd West, Clwyd South, Conwy, Delyn, Vale of Clwyd, Wrexham and Ynys Môn. From the 2007 Assembly election the region included Aberconwy, Alyn and Deeside, Arfon, Clwyd South, Clwyd West, Delyn, Vale of Clwyd, Wrexham and Ynys Môn.

Voting 
In elections for the Senedd, each voter has two votes. The first vote may be used to vote for a candidate to become the Assembly Member for the voter's constituency, elected by the first past the post system. The second vote may be used to vote for a regional closed party list of candidates. Additional member seats are allocated from the lists by the d'Hondt method, with constituency results being taken into account in the allocation.

Assembly Members and Members of the Senedd

Elections

Elections in the 2020s

Elections in the 2010s 

Regional ballots rejected at the count: 144

Elections in the 2000s 

2003 Electorate: 49,998
Regional ballots rejected: 239

Elections in the 1990s

See also 
 North Wales (Senedd electoral region)
 Senedd constituencies and electoral regions

References 

Senedd constituencies in the North Wales electoral region
Politics of Anglesey
1999 establishments in Wales
Constituencies established in 1999